Debits and Credits is a 1926 collection of fourteen stories, nineteen poems, and two scenes from a play by Rudyard Kipling, an English writer who wrote extensively about British colonialism in India and Burma. Four of the poems that accompany the stories are whimsically presented as translations from the "Bk. V of Odes" by Horace, but are actually poems by Kipling imitating the style of the Roman poet.

Contents

Stories
"The Enemies to Each Other"
 The story of Adam and Eve retold in the style of a Muslim fable
"Sea Constables: a Tale of ’15"
 Weekend sailors turned naval officers discuss their patrolling of the coast over dinner
" 'In the Interests of the Brethren' "
 An account of the generous hospitality of a Masonic Lodge in wartime
"The United Idolaters"
 A tale of school life, in which Stalky & Co discover Uncle Remus and outrage a new master
"The Wish House"
 An old Sussex woman talks about the love of her life and the price she paid for loving him
"The Janeites"
 A still-bewildered old soldier recalls how he came to join a 'secret society' of Jane Austen admirers and gives his own unique take on her oeuvre
"The Prophet and the Country"
 A stranded motorist meets an exiled American who explains his passionate objection to Prohibition
"The Bull that Thought"
 A story about an uncannily intelligent bull with a flair for the bullfight
"A Madonna of the Trenches"
 After the war, a soldier reveals the true cause of his "shell-shock"
"The Propagation of Knowledge"
 A tale of school life, in which Stalky & Co bait their English master with the Curiosities of Literature and the Baconian theory
"A Friend of the Family"
 An Australian soldier avenges his friend by waging war on the home front
"On the Gate: a Tale of ’16"
 A fantasy in which St Peter and the administrators of Heaven struggle to cope with the surge of souls from the war
"The Eye of Allah"
 In a mediaeval abbey, an artist shows some doctors an early microscope, which provokes debate
"The Gardener"
 A story about respectability and mother-love

Poems
The Changelings
The Vineyard
‘Banquet Night’
To the Companions (Horace, ode 17, Bk. v.)
The Centaurs
‘Late Came the God’
Rahere
The Survival (Horace, Ode 22 Bk. v.)
Jane’s Marriage
The Portent (Horace, Ode 20, Bk, v.)
Alnaschar and the Oxen
Gipsy Vans
The Birthright
A Legend of Truth
We and They
The Supports
Untimely
The Last Ode: Nov. 27, B.C. 8 (Horace, Ode 31, Bk. v.)
The Burden

Play Fragments
Gow’s Watch : Act IV. Sc. 4
Gow’s Watch: Act V. Sc. 3

References

External links
 Full text of Debits and Credits at Project Gutenberg Australia
 A Readers' Guide to Debits and Credits

1926 poetry books
1926 short story collections
English poetry collections
Poetry by Rudyard Kipling
Short story collections by Rudyard Kipling